The Bridge of the Lions (Spanish: Puente de Los Leones) is a bridge along Av. Juventud Heroica in Mexico City, Mexico, adjacent to Chapultepec. Completed in 1975, the bridge features four bronze sculptures of lions and is flanked by cypress gardens.

See also
 Puerta de los Leones

References

External links
 

1975 establishments in Mexico
Bridges completed in 1975
Bridges in Mexico
Chapultepec